Elk River is a  stream in Routt County, Colorado, United States. It flows from a confluence of the North Fork Elk River and Middle Fork Elk River in Routt National Forest north of Steamboat Springs to a confluence with the Yampa River.

See also

 List of rivers of Colorado
 List of tributaries of the Colorado River

References

External links

Rivers of Colorado
Rivers of Routt County, Colorado
Tributaries of the Colorado River in Colorado